Trollhunters: Tales of Arcadia (or simply Trollhunters) is an American computer-animated fantasy streaming television series created by Guillermo del Toro and produced by DreamWorks Animation Television and Double Dare You Productions for Netflix, based on the 2015 novel Trollhunters by del Toro and Daniel Kraus. It follows the story of James "Jim" Lake Jr., a teenage boy who finds a mysterious amulet and stumbles across a secret realm inhabited by trolls and other magical creatures. Soon afterward, he and his friends are charged with protecting the world from the dangerous monsters that lurk in the shadows of their small suburban town.

The first two episodes of the series premiered on October 8, 2016, at the New York Comic Con. The first season was released worldwide on Netflix on December 23, 2016. The second season premiered on December 15, 2017, and the third and final season premiered on May 25, 2018.

Since its release, Trollhunters has been widely praised as an ambitious and boundary-pushing animated series.  The series was nominated for nine Daytime Emmy Awards in 2017, winning more than any other animated or live-action television program that year. In its first three seasons, it has also received or been nominated for a BAFTA Award, several Annie Awards, Kidscreen Awards, Golden Reel Awards, and a Saturn Award.  The show has also spawned several original children's books and has been adapted into a series of graphic novels by Marc Guggenheim and Richard Hamilton, released by Dark Horse Comics.

Anton Yelchin was part of the series through the first two seasons, as he had recorded enough dialogue to complete them before his sudden death. Yelchin was also able to provide a portion of dialogue for the final season, while the remaining portions of dialogue were recorded by Emile Hirsch.

Following the show's success, Guillermo del Toro announced that Trollhunters would be the first chapter in a trilogy of television series, collectively titled Tales of Arcadia. The story was continued in a science fiction inspired follow-up series entitled 3Below: Tales of Arcadia, and the trilogy concluded in a fantasy series entitled Wizards: Tales of Arcadia.  It also premiered on Pop in the UK on September 3, 2018.

A full-length feature film, titled Trollhunters: Rise of the Titans, was released on July 21, 2021.

Synopsis

Part 1
When Jim Lake Jr. finds the Amulet of Daylight under a canal from the remains of a dead body, he will embark on an adventure of a lifetime protecting Arcadia from villains with the help of his human friends Toby and Claire, and his troll friends, Blinky, AAARRRGGHH!!!, and Draal.

Part 2
With Jim trapped in the Darklands, his friends race to rescue him. With Jim out of the Darklands, he faces repercussions for his actions by going in. Blinky deals with old family wounds as the rest of Trollmarket deals with a possible mole among them. Things are not made easier when Steve Palchuk and Eli Pepperjack begin to stumble upon Jim's double life, on top of the pressures of high school.

Part 3
It's the end of sophomore year at Arcadia High: Jim's double life has taken its toll on his mother as Claire experiences trouble from an ancient sorceress. Gunmar has taken control of the Heartstone Trollmarket. The great wizard Merlin turns Jim into a half troll.

Voice cast

Main
 Kelsey Grammer as Blinkous "Blinky" Galadrigal, Jim's six-eyed four-armed troll mentor. A wise and scholarly troll with a heart of gold, he serves as the brains of the Trollhunters and eventually becomes a sort of father figure to Jim.
 Anton Yelchin (episodes 1–41) and Emile Hirsch (episodes 42–52) as James "Jim" Lake Jr. / Trollhunter, the first human Trollhunter and a reluctant hero dealing with the pressures of leading a double life. He has a talent for cooking and eventually sword-fighting, and cares deeply for his mother and friends. Yelchin provided the voice of Jim from Part 1, through portions of Part 3 before his death. Hirsch assumed the role and replaced him.
 Charlie Saxton as Tobias "Toby" Domzalski, Jim's best friend and confidant. Dorky and excitable, he fully embraces the secret world of trolls and aids Jim in his quests. His weapon of choice is a warhammer.
 Lexi Medrano as Claire Maria Nuñez, Jim's best friend/girlfriend. She is a feisty, kind, jolly, sarcastic, curious, and intelligent tomboy who enjoys books and is a talented martial artist and gymnast. She obtains the Shadow Staff (Skathe-Hrün), a staff capable of creating portals activated by the user's emotions.
 Jonathan Hyde as Waltolomew ‘Walter’ Stricklander ‘Strickler’, Jim's history teacher who is actually a Changeling. When Jim discovers the truth, in Young Atlas, he loses all respect for him and the two become bitter enemies. However, he remains affable toward Jim and has redeeming qualities.
 Fred Tatasciore as Aarghaumont "AAARRRGGHH!!!", a burly troll and close companion of Blinky, who forms a deep bond with Toby. He was kidnapped by the Gumm-Gumms as a child from the Krubera (a race of troll that lives deep in the earth) which stunted his vocabulary. Tormented by the atrocities he committed, he deserted Gunmar to live a life of peace (as shown in Wizards). However, he will still fight to protect those he cares about.
 Victor Raider-Wexler as Vendel, the leader of Trollmarket. An ancient and wizened troll, Vendel is at first suspicious of Jim and often comes across as a pessimist, but shows a softer side and eventual faith in Jim. At the end of Part 2, he is killed by Usurna after she reveals herself to be working for Gunmar, but not before recording the act to warn the Trollhunters.
 Ron Perlman as Bular, the son of Gunmar. A brutish and powerful troll warrior, he is obsessed with freeing his father from the Darklands. He holds a special disdain for Changelings, whom he considers "impure", putting him at odds with Strickler and other Changelings who seek to free Gunmar. He is killed by Jim in the first half of season 1, but later makes appearances in the season 1 episode "Where Is My Mind" and the season 2 episode "Unbecoming".
 Clancy Brown as Gunmar, the iron-fisted leader of the Gumm-Gumms who reside in the Darklands. He is powerful and ruthless, and will readily dispose of loyal minions and allies who can no longer serve him. He has no qualms about enslaving or killing his fellow trolls to accomplish his goals. However, he cares deeply for his son. Despite his apparent main antagonist role, Gunmar in fact serves Morgana.
 Amy Landecker as Barbara Lake, Jim's protective and overworked mother. Her husband left the family when Jim was five years old. Her doctor job means she's often away from home, which lets Jim pursue his Trollhunter duties.
 Steven Yeun as Steve Palchuk, a narcissistic bully who frequently harasses Jim. Suspicious of Jim's unusual behavior, he eventually discovers the truth and teams up with Eli Pepperjack becoming the Creepslayerz to help Jim in Part 2.
 Cole Sand as Eli Pepperjack, a nerdy classmate of Jim who believes in the paranormal. In Part 2, he teams up with Steve Palchuk to investigate the strange creatures they both have seen and to help Jim.

Recurring
 Matthew Waterson as Draal, the son of previous Trollhunter, Kanjigar. He is originally jealous and suspicious of Jim but later befriends him – acting as Jim's fighting tutor. During a battle in the museum, Draal sacrifices his lower right arm while removing the Trollhunter amulet from the Killahead Bridge to close the portal, and later obtains a mechanical prosthetic. Draal explains that his father kept a distance from him as he grew up, and he had hoped to become the next Trollhunter that he might earn his father's approval. He was killed by Angor Rot in season three.
 Lauren Tom as Nomura, the Changeling museum curator and a colleague of Strickler. Originally an antagonist, she was pulled into the Darklands and imprisoned by Gunmar for her failures. When Jim is captured in the Darklands, the two form a connection and escape together.
 Jimmie Wood as NotEnrique, the Changeling swapped with Claire's baby brother Enrique. While troublesome and self-serving, he isn't actively malicious and even helps the Trollhunters from time to time (usually after being bribed). He forms a rocky but brotherly connection with Claire.
 Tom Hiddleston and James Purefoy as Kanjigar the Courageous, Draal's father and the noble Trollhunter prior to Jim. His ghost tutors Jim, often worrying about Jim's team fighting style, believing that the Trollhunter must work alone to avoid endangering those he cares about – this leads to Jim's guilt and decision to venture into the Darklands alone. Hiddleston provided the voice acting for Kanjigar during the series premiere, while Purefoy was cast to assume the role for the rest of the series.
 Ike Amadi as Angor Rot, an ancient troll assassin who hunts down Trollhunters and takes their souls. In medieval times, Angor made a deal with Morgana, surrendering his own soul in return for his mystical powers.
 Rodrigo Blaas as Gnome Chompsky, a Gnome adopted by Toby. He started out as a "rogue Gnome" causing trouble, but after he was finally defeated by Jim he became friendly when he was given a dollhouse to live in and a plastic doll to be his companion. He later helps locate Enrique in the Darklands and also helps rescue Jim from the Darklands.
 Mark Hamill as Dictatious Galadrigal, Blinky's brother. Presumed dead, he helps Gunmar in his quest to conquer the surface lands. He is blinded by Blinky during a struggle in the Darklands.
 Anjelica Huston as Queen Usurna, the queen of the Krubera, AAARRRGGHH!!!'s race of trolls who lives in the Deep Caverns, and a member of a council of troll leaders known as the Tribunal. She initially seems to be a kind queen concerned for AAARRRGGHH!!!'s well-being. As a Tribunal member, she is strict and judgmental and leads the Tribunal to act against Jim and his friends. Late in Part 2, she reveals herself to be a traitor who works for Gunmar and helps him take over Trollmarket.
 Lena Headey as Morgana le Fay / The Pale Lady/ The Eldritch Queen/ Argante/ Baba Yaga, an ancient and seemingly malevolent entity and the patron of Angor Rot.
 Laraine Newman as Lenora Janeth, the algebra and drama teacher of Arcadia Oaks High.
 Tom Kenny as Otto Scaarbach, a Changeling Polymorph who can change into the form of anyone. He is the Grand Commandant of the Janus Order, a secret society of Changelings who assist the Gumm-Gumms.  He also voices Claire's father, Javier Nuñez, and Dadblank in 3Below and Rise of the Titans.
David Bradley as Merlin, the wizard who created the Trollhunter's amulet.
 Colin O'Donoghue as Hisirdoux "Douxie" Casperan, a charming English teen from Arcadia Oaks Academy whose band, "Ash Dispersal Pattern", is an entrant in the Battle of the Bands in Part 3.  In Rise of the Titans he is a major character, and a former apprentice (now he is a master wizard) to Merlin.  
 Tatiana Maslany as Aja, a "foreign exchange student" from "Cantaloupia" and older sister to Krel. Jim is tasked to show them around and acclimate them to Arcadia late in Part 3. The character (alongside Krel) returns in Rise of the Titans.
 Diego Luna as Krel, younger brother to Aja. The character (alongside Aja) returns in Rise of the Titans.
 Yara Shahidi as Darci Scott, Jim, Toby and Claire's classmate.

Production

Development
Initially, del Toro envisioned the idea as a live-action television series; however this was deemed impractical due to budgetary concerns, and as a result he instead turned the idea into a book. DreamWorks Animation optioned the book to develop as an animated feature film, to be directed by Guillermo del Toro and Rodrigo Blaas. Eventually, Netflix greenlit the project as a high-end animated series instead, eager to work with del Toro and expand their slate of original animated programming. Rodrigo Blaas became an executive producer and supervising director on the series.

Del Toro modeled the show's sensibilities after shows he grew up with such as Jonny Quest, identifying them as "really earnest and emotionally beautiful". To this end, he sought to make the main character of Jim "in that '70s mold," and "really a very good boy" with del Toro noting that this was a constant struggle for him to express. Eventually he came across Anton Yelchin, who embodied those qualities although by del Toro's estimate it still took him a few sessions to fully understand the character.

Writing
When creating the show's narrative, del Toro noted that he and the writers wanted a "bittersweet journey" for the main character dealing with issues that most such "power fantasies" failed to address, telling Indiewire, "... I wanted to say, 'Look, you can be in high school and you can have your problems. Then you get all these powers and then you have a different set of problems. There is not such a thing as a final, great outcome.

The writing team remained small and consistent throughout its entire fifty-two episode run, allowing Marc Guggenheim, The Hageman Brothers, Aaron Waltke, Chad Quandt, and A.C. Bradley to build out all three seasons in advance of the show's premiere without interruption. This provided the writers a rare opportunity for an unusual amount of intricate planning and plot serialization to be woven throughout the series, including details planted for secrets that wouldn't be revealed until seasons later, sometimes even hinting at storylines for future installments of Tales of Arcadia that wouldn't be announced until years afterward.

Cast
The show serves as one of Yelchin's final projects as he died shortly after recording most of his character's dialogue. Producer del Toro refused to replace his recordings, which del Toro noted was a challenge for the show's recording engineers. Of his decision, del Toro stated that the actor "was proud of what he did, and we were so proud of how he did it." Del Toro added that his experience as a father and Yelchin's young age were also factors that led to the decision.  Some roles were written specifically for the actors who eventually portrayed them. In the earliest sketch for the series in one of del Toro's notebooks, the character of Blinky was drawn with Kelsey Grammer's name next to it, who accepted the role when the series was eventually greenlit.

Episodes

Season 1 (2016)

Season 2 (2017)

Season 3 (2018)

Trollhunters: Rise of the Titans

Trollhunters: Rise of the Titans is a full-length feature film, taking place a year after the events of Wizards: Tales of Arcadia, that was released on Wednesday, July 21, 2021.

Synopsis 
Further imformation: Trollhunters: Rise of the Titans' plot

The Guardians of Arcadia reunite and plan their attack against the nefarious Arcane Order. After a failed to attempt to destroy the Genesis Seals, the Arcane Order has reawakened the primordial Titans and they are seeking to combine with the heartstone at the center of the universe (which is Arcadia Oaks). As the heroes manage to defeat one titan at the cost of another titan, who is on the side of the heroes, they all come in Arcadia Oaks, and their leader, Jim Lake Jr ultimately pulls Excalibur off from the stone, and in new armor, he manages to kill the final member of the Arcane Order, Bellroc, saving the world but at the cost of his best friend, Toby Domzaski. Jim then travels back in time to the morning where he found the amulet and allows Toby to take over the mantle of the trollhunter.

Release
The two-episode pilot of the series premiered on October 8, 2016, at the New York Comic Con. The first season consisted of 26 half-hour episodes which were released worldwide on Netflix on December 23, 2016. The second season, consisting of 13 episodes, was released on December 15, 2017. The third and final season, consisting of 13 episodes, was released on May 25, 2018.

Home media
The first season of Trollhunters was released on DVD on November 7, 2017.

Reception

Critical response
Trollhunters has received critical acclaim and positive reviews from critics. The review aggregator website Rotten Tomatoes reported a 94% approval rating based on 16 reviews for the first season. The website's consensus reads, "Trollhunters manages to capture del Toro's enthusiasm for telling monster stories, in a youthful and more colorful fashion that may well earn him a new generation of fans." On Metacritic, the season has a normalized score of 69 out of 100 based on 9 critics, indicating "generally favorable reviews".

In 2017, it received six Daytime Emmys, more than any other television program, animated or live action, that year.

The second season of Trollhunters was nominated for six Annie Awards, tied for the most nominations of any television program in 2018. It was also nominated for four Daytime Emmy Awards, including Best Children's Animated Series, and won the Emmy for Outstanding Writing in an Animated Program.

On January 30, 2017, Trollhunters writers Kevin and Dan Hageman stated that the series is the most successful Netflix original show to date that is targeted at a younger audience.

Accolades

Tales of Arcadia

On November 6, 2017, show creator Guillermo del Toro announced that Trollhunters would be expanded into a trilogy of animated series known as Tales of Arcadia. The trilogy was continued by a sci-fi animated series known as 3Below: Tales of Arcadia, which centers on two royal aliens and their bodyguard who escape from their home planet and crash-land on Earth in Arcadia, where Trollhunters also takes place. There, the aliens adjust to human culture and try to fix their spaceship to return and take back their home planet, which is being taken over by an evil dictator. 3Below premiered on Netflix in 2018. The trilogy then was concluded with the animated series Wizards: Tales of Arcadia, in which wizard-in-training named Douxie Casperan must embark on a time-bending adventure to medieval Camelot in a battle with the Arcane Order. The limited series premiered on Netflix on August 7, 2020.

Tales of Arcadia ended with a full-length feature film entitled Trollhunters: Rise of the Titans, which brings together the three disparate worlds of trolls, aliens and wizards who have found themselves drawn to Arcadia, "...culminating in an apocalyptic battle for the control of magic that will ultimately determine the fate of these supernatural worlds that have now converged". The film was announced on August 7, 2020, and was released globally on Netflix on Wednesday, July 21, 2021.

References

External links 

  at DreamWorks TV
 Trollhunters: Tales of Arcadia on Netflix
 
 

2016 American television series debuts
2018 American television series endings
2010s American animated television series
American children's animated action television series
American children's animated adventure television series
American children's animated comic science fiction television series
American children's animated drama television series
American children's animated science fantasy television series
American computer-animated television series
American television shows based on children's books
Annie Award winners
Netflix children's programming
Tales of Arcadia
Television series by DreamWorks Animation
Television series by Universal Television
Television shows set in California
Trolls in popular culture
Works by Guillermo del Toro
English-language Netflix original programming